This is an episode list for Off Their Rockers, a British television series. There have been 13 episodes aired over 2 series, with a third series of 9 episodes airing in 2015.

Series overview

Episodes

Series 1
The first series consisted of six episodes and ran from 7 April until 12 May 2013.

Series 2
After a successful run in 2013, a second series was commissioned. The second series consisted of seven episodes and ran from 6 April until 18 May 2014.

Series 3
After a successful run in 2014, a third series was commissioned on 7 August 2014. The series began airing on 1 March 2015 for nine episodes.

References

Off Their Rockers